Liam Fox (born 2 February 1984) is a Scottish professional football coach and former player, who was most recently the manager of Dundee United.

Fox, who played as a midfielder, began his playing career with Heart of Midlothian, from where he was loaned to Crusaders in Northern Ireland. After a spell with Inverness Caledonian Thistle, Fox played for Livingston between 2006 and 2013, making over 200 appearances. He then played for Raith Rovers before returning to Hearts as a coach. 

From 2016 to 2017, Fox was head coach of Scottish League Two club Cowdenbeath. He rejoined Hearts as a first team coach, and left in September 2020. After stints as an assistant manager with Livingston and Dundee United, he was appointed United manager in September 2022. He left that position in February 2023.

Career

Hearts
Fox started his career as a youth team player at Heart of Midlothian. Having been an unused substitute for the first team once, he was loaned to Northern Ireland club Crusaders in 2004, where he made ten appearances and scored one goal.

Inverness CT
On his return to Scotland he was signed by Scottish Football League First Division team Inverness Caledonian Thistle in 2004. During his time at the club, Inverness were promoted to the Scottish Premier League. Fox scored four goals in 26 first team appearances for the club.

Livingston
In 2006, Fox signed for Livingston, then playing in the Scottish Football League First Division. Shortly after his arrival the club were placed into administration and subsequently demoted two divisions by the Scottish Football Association to the Scottish Football League Third Division. Following seven years and 219 appearances for Livingston, it was announced that Fox would be leaving the club after the 2012–13 season. On 4 May 2013, he scored for the club in his last appearance in a 3–2 defeat to Raith Rovers.

Raith Rovers
On 1 June 2013, Fox signed for Raith Rovers.

Coaching career

In the summer of 2015, Fox returned to Hearts as a coach. He also registered as a player and he appeared in a pre-season friendly against former club Raith Rovers on 7 July 2015.

Fox was appointed head coach of Cowdenbeath in May 2016. Fox was sacked on 6 March 2017, with Cowdenbeath bottom of Scottish League Two and at risk of their third consecutive relegation.

In 2017 Fox returned to Hearts as a First Team coach, before being moved to Reserves Head Coach in December 2019 following a reshuffle after Daniel Stendel's appointment as Manager. In September 2020 Fox left Hearts due to lack of reserves football in Scotland and the hiring of other First Team coaches. 

In December 2020, Fox was appointed as assistant manager at Livingston, under manager David Martindale. Fox left this role in May 2021.

Dundee United
In June 2021 Fox joined Dundee United as assistant manager. Fox was appointed caretaker manager of Dundee United in August 2022 following the sacking of Jack Ross. In his first game in charge, he led United to a 2–1 Scottish League Cup victory against Livingston on 31 August 2022. On 23 September, he was appointed manager of Dundee United on a permanent basis. Fox left United in February 2023, with the team sitting four points adrift at the bottom of the 2022–23 Scottish Premiership after a 4–0 defeat at Ross County. The club had only won six matches, and drawn three, in 22 games with Fox in permanent charge.

Managerial record

 Initially caretaker and appointed permanently on 23 September 2022

Honours
Raith Rovers
Scottish Challenge Cup: 2013–14

References

External links

1984 births
Living people
Scottish footballers
Scottish Premier League players
Scottish Football League players
Crusaders F.C. players
Heart of Midlothian F.C. players
Inverness Caledonian Thistle F.C. players
Livingston F.C. players
Raith Rovers F.C. players
Footballers from Edinburgh
Association football midfielders
NIFL Premiership players
Scottish Professional Football League players
Heart of Midlothian F.C. non-playing staff
Scottish football managers
Cowdenbeath F.C. managers
Scottish Professional Football League managers
Dundee United F.C. non-playing staff